"C'mon and Swim" is a song by Bobby Freeman, written by Thomas Coman and Sylvester Stewart (later known as Sly Stone) and produced by Stewart. It reached #5 on the U.S. pop chart in 1964. It was featured on Freeman's 1964 album C'mon and Swim.

The song ranked #54 on Billboard magazine's Top 100 singles of 1964.

Other charting versions
Ray Columbus & the Invaders released a version of the song as a single in 1965 which reached #71 in Australia.

Other versions
Ray Anthony released a version of the song on his 1964 album Swim, Swim, C'mon and Swim.
Enoch Light and His Orchestra released a version of the song on their 1964 album Discotheque: Dance Dance Dance.
Billy Strange released a version of the song on his 1964 album The James Bond Theme.
 Leroy Jones recorded a version that was released on Hit 136.
Lloyd Thaxton released a version of the song on his 1964 album Lloyd Thaxton Presents.
 A version re-titled, "Jerk" was recorded by Mexican group, Los Rebeldes del Rock and released on Orfeon 45-1715.
The Up featuring Allen Ginsberg released a version of the song on their 1995 compilation album Killer Up! (1969-1972).
Martha and the Vandellas released a version of the song on their 2013 compilation album 50th Anniversary - The Singles Collection 1962-1972.

References

1964 songs
1964 singles
Songs written by Sly Stone
Martha and the Vandellas songs
Song recordings produced by Sly Stone
Song recordings produced by Ivy Jo Hunter